David Leslie Robson (born 22 January 2002) is a professional footballer who plays for Championship side Hull City as a goalkeeper. He is a Wales under-21 international.

Club career

Hull City 
Robson made his debut on 9 August 2022 in the 2–1 defeat to Bradford City in the EFL Cup. On 19 August 2022, Robson joined League Two club Crawley Town on loan until January 2023.

International
In September 2022 Robson made his debut for the Wales national under-21 football team in the starting line-up for the 2-0 friendly match defeat against Austria under-21.

Career statistics

References

External links
 

2002 births
Living people
Association football goalkeepers
Hull City A.F.C. players
Crawley Town F.C. players
Welsh footballers
Wales under-21 international footballers
English Football League players